The Bass Coast Rail Trail is a Rail trail located in the Bass Coast Shire of Gippsland, Victoria, Australia.

The trail has been constructed along a section of the former Wonthaggi line. The trail starts at the former Anderson station and finishes shortly after the former Wonthaggi Station.

The original railway line opened in 1910, being used for the transport of coal from Kilcunda and Wonthaggi, and local agricultural produce, as well as for public transport. The line was closed in 1978.

Route description 

From Anderson to Kilcunda the trail drops  in height as it winds down through farming country. Here, the gravel path is overgrown and trail users need to negotiate several gates. The rail trail at Kilcunda is built on the coastal sand dunes and incorporates a landmark trestle bridge over Bourne Creek. Path users have panoramic scenic views of the Bass Strait coast and the Wonthaggi Wind Farm that was erected during 2005.

Heading towards Wonthaggi, the trail passes through flat agricultural fields, and is not always well maintained with grass being allowed to overgrow the path. The trail uses a few small bridges to cross the Powlett River and tributaries. The trail near Wonthaggi is packed gravel and features the heritage listed Wonthaggi station, and the historic Central Mine Reserve.

Attractions on the trail 

Anderson Station
Kilcunda Station
Kilcunda trestle bridge over Bourne Creek
Dalyston Station
Branch off towards the former Dudley Area mine
State Mine Station (the trail passes through the location, however it is not officially marked)
Wonthaggi Station

References 
 Rail Trails of Australia description
 Bike Paths Victoria sixth edition, 2004. Edited and published by Sabey & Associates Pty Ltd. pp148.

See also 
 Cycling in Victoria

Rail trails in Victoria (Australia)
Gippsland (region)